Delta Tour was the fourth headlining concert tour by British band Mumford & Sons, in support of the album of the same name (2018). It began on 16 November 2018 in Dublin, Ireland and the last show before the COVID-19 pandemic was held  on 8 March 2020 at Okeechobee Music & Arts Festival.

Critical reception
Ed Power of The Telegraph rated the show in Dublin four out of five stars and called it as "a valiant and warm-hearted attempt to connect with their crowd". Reviewing the show in London, Laura Abernethy of Metro rated the show three out of five stars and praised the "ambitious" staging but criticized the set list, noting it "a bit disconnected".

A.D. Amorosi of Variety reviewed the show in Philadelphia and called it "epic" and "earthen". Jeffrey B. Remz of Country Standard Time called the show in Boston as it "was far more up to snuff, albeit not perfect". Jim Shahen Jr. of Times Union highlighted the performance of "I Will Wait", noting it "sent the folks home happy". Jordan Zivitz of Montreal Gazette noted the band's intention on "preserving the intimacy of early shows" and noted that "the vote of confidence in their present was just as crucial as celebrations of their past." Chris Racic of CleveRock praised the stage-in-the-round, noted that it successfully provided "a feeling of intimacy". Reviewing the show in Lexington, Carly Necessary of The Cardinal Spirit noted that their "energetic and lively aura was easily recognizable" and described it an "exhilarating" concert.

Set list
This set list is from the concert on 9 March 2019 in Cleveland, United States. It is not intended to represent all tour dates.

"42"
"Guiding Light"
"Little Lion Man"
"Babel"
"Lover of the Light"
"Tompkins Square Park"
"Woman"
"Holland Road"
"Beloved"
"The Cave"
"Ditmas"
"Believe"
"Picture You"
"Darkness Visible"
"The Wolf"

Encore
"Timshel"
"Hurt" 
"I Will Wait"
"Delta"

Tour dates

Notes

References

2018 concert tours
2019 concert tours
Concert tours of Europe
Concert tours of North America
Concert tours of Oceania
Concert tours of Asia